Chang Jo-ri (창조리, 倉助利) (?-?) was the prime minister of Goguryeo during the reigns of Kings Bongsang and Micheon.

Background 
Chang Jo-ri's origins or ancestry is not mentioned in historical records. It can be inferred that Prime Minister Chang Jo-ri came from a notable noble family because he served in high government positions such as Daesaja and Daejubu.

Life

Reign of King Bongsang 
Chang Jo-ri is first mentioned to have served as Daesaja of the South Province, and later as Daejubu. He rose to the position of Prime Minister in the year 294, succeeding Prime Minister Sang-nu. In 296, Emperor You of the Xianbei Former Yan Kingdom, invaded Goguryeo. With this invasion, Chang Jo-ri urged the King to assign Daehyeong general Go Noja to the position of Castlelord of Shin Fortress. The Former Yan forces were defeated due to this assignment. When King Bongsang became corrupt and violent, Chang Jo-ri resigned from the position of Prime Minister and planned a coup to overthrow the tyrant and place Go Eul-bul, the King's nephew, on the throne. Chang Jo-ri staged the coup in the year 300, and overthrew King Bongsang, who committed suicide upon being banished.

Reign of King Micheon 
Chang Jo-ri was reinstated to the position of prime minister under King Micheon. Samguk Sagi describes the benign rule of King Micheon, and his advisor Prime Minister Chang Jo-ri. The year of his death is unknown.

See also 
 Three Kingdoms of Korea
 Goguryeo
 Micheon of Goguryeo

Sources 
 Samguk Sagi, Goguryeo Bon-Gi

Goguryeo people
4th-century heads of government
3rd-century heads of government
Year of birth unknown
Year of death unknown